Algot Sebastian Nanasi (born 16 May 2002) is a Swedish footballer currently playing as a forward for Malmö FF.

Career 
Nanasi made his full international debut for Sweden on 9 January 2023, replacing Yasin Ayari 82 minutes into a friendly 2–0 win against Finland.

Personal life
Nanasi is of Hungarian descent through his father, who played floorball and represented Hungary internationally.

Career statistics

Club

Notes

International

Honours

Malmö FF
 Allsvenskan: 2021
 Svenska Cupen: 2021–22

References

2002 births
Living people
Swedish footballers
Sweden youth international footballers
Sweden international footballers
Swedish people of Hungarian descent
Association football forwards
Ettan Fotboll players
Allsvenskan players
Viby IF players
Kristianstad FC players
Malmö FF players
Varbergs BoIS players
People from Kristianstad Municipality
Footballers from Skåne County